(stylized as eneloop) is a brand of 1.2-volt low self-discharge nickel–metal hydride (NiMH) rechargeable batteries and accessories developed by Sanyo and introduced in 2005. Panasonic acquired a majority stake in Sanyo in 2009, and Eneloop batteries were thereafter branded, but not manufactured, by Panasonic.

Eneloop cells lose their charge much more slowly than the 0.5–4% per day loss of previously available NiMH batteries, retaining about 85% of their charge for a year after charging; This allows them to be sold precharged. Since then many other makes of NiMH batteries are supplied precharged, with long charge retention.

Since Sanyo introduced the Eneloop, many other brands of low-self-discharge batteries became available, described as "low self-discharge","LSD", "pre-charged", or similar. By 2020 most NIMH batteries available were of this type, with varying capacity, self-discharge rate, and lifespan. Those made in Japan are all made in the same factory, but not necessarily to the same specification as the Eneloop brand. There are also counterfeits of Eneloop and other well-regarded brands.

Because they can replace a large number of alkaline batteries over their life cycle, Eneloops are marketed as being eco-friendly.

History
Sanyo was acquired by Panasonic in 2009. In exchange for US FTC approval of the takeover, Panasonic agreed to sell Sanyo's portable NiMH battery business to Fujitsu subsidiary FDK in order to preserve competition, and later did so.

Panasonic retained the "Eneloop" trademark, sourcing the batteries from FDK (formerly Sanyo) factories.

Technology
After NIMH rechargeable batteries were introduced, they were developed to increase capacity. This was done by using thinner insulators internally, allowing more of the active components to be used and thus increasing capacity. The thin insulators allowed significant leakage, leading to relatively short self-discharge times. Eneloop batteries were designed in a way that traded off somewhat lower capacity for much slower self-discharge. The trade-off was modified for the Eneloop Pro series, providing higher capacity but with more self-discharge and shorter lifespan. The Eneloop Lite series traded significantly lower capacity for longer lifespan, and also faster charging and lower weight.

Variant description 

The Eneloop is the standard general-purpose cell. The cheaper Eneloop Lite has lower capacity and a longer lifespan in charge cycles, but the standard and Lite of about the same time have very similar total lifetime capacity in watt-hours. The more expensive Eneloop Pro has significantly higher capacity and is suitable for higher-current applications, but has poorer charge retention and shorter lifespan in charge cycles; total lifetime capacity in watt-hours is much less than the other versions. Numerical data are listed in the variant comparison tables section. The discontinued Eneloop Plus was similar to the standard Eneloop, with overheating protection.

Eneloop

1st generation 
The original Eneloop batteries were introduced in AA and AAA size, with capacities of 2,000 mAh and 800 mAh. They could be recharged 1,000 times and held up to 75% of their charge after one year. The part numbers for first generation cells are HR-3UTG (AA) and HR-4UTG (AAA).

2nd generation 
The second generation of Eneloop AA and AAA batteries was introduced in 2010. It endured 1,500 recharge cycles for depth of discharge (DOD) 60% and held 85% of the charge after one year and 75% after three years. The part numbers for second generation cells are HR-3UTGA (AA) and HR-4UTGA (AAA).

Sanyo introduced C- and D-sized Eneloop batteries with a minimum capacity of 2,700 mAh and 3,000 mAh respectively in 2009, along with a new universal charger. As these sizes were only available in Japan and Singapore, Sanyo offered adapter sleeves to fit AA batteries in devices that take C or D batteries.

3rd generation 

In October 2011 the batteries were again improved to retain up to 90% of their capacity after one year, 80% after three years and 70% after five years. The batteries can be recharged up to 1,800 times, rather than the 1,500 times of the previous revision. The part numbers for third generation cells are HR-3UTGB (AA) and HR-4UTGB (AAA). At the same time, the C- and D-sized Eneloop batteries' stated minimum capacities were increased to 3,000 mAh and 5,700 mAh respectively. They were available in Japan from November 2011.

European models went on sale from the beginning of October 2012.

4th generation 
Following the acquisition of Sanyo by Panasonic, a fourth generation was introduced in April 2013. The number of charges per cell was increased from 1800 to 2100 cycles for both AA (BK-3MCC) and AAA (BK-4MCC) models. In some countries the batteries are branded as Panasonic.

5th generation 
A fifth generation was introduced in 2022 (manufactured from at least April 2021). The minimum (guaranteed) capacity was increased from 1900 to 2000 mAh for AA (BK-3MCDx) and from 750 to 800 mAh for AAA (BK-4MCDx) models. These batteries are supposed to hold up to 70% of their charge after 10 years of storage at 20°C.

Eneloop Lite

1st generation 
The Eneloop Lite line was released in Japan in June 2010. They addressed two disadvantages of alkaline and other NiMH batteries: the initial cost and the long charging time—both achieved by reducing the capacity of the battery. The batteries find suitable applications in low-drain devices such as remote control devices and alarms, where low capacity is not an issue. The AAs have 1,000 mAh of capacity, while the AAAs have 600 mAh. Due to reduction of the capacity compared to the regular Eneloop cells, the charging time is halved for the AA and reduced by 25% for the AAA. On the other hand, they can be recharged 3,000 times. The reduction in capacity also reduced the production cost, which decreased the initial investment for rechargeable batteries. They also weigh 30% less. The product numbers are HR-3UQ (AA) and HR-4UQ (AAA).

2nd generation 
Along with the upgrade of the regular Eneloop cells in April 2013, the Lite version was also upgraded. According to Panasonic, it can now be recharged up to 3,000 times (life cycles for DOD 60%) (model numbers BK-3LCC for the AA and BK-4LCC for the AAA battery). The upgraded batteries also retain 90% of the charge after one year like the regular Eneloop cells.

Eneloop Pro (Eneloop XX)

The Eneloop Pro family have higher capacity in mAh, trading this off against poorer charge retention and shorter lifespan. They are better than standard Eneloops for high-drain applications. They are not recommended for applications where batteries are continuously charged, such as in DECT phones left on a charging base. Their higher self-discharge rate makes them unsuitable for very low drain applications such as clocks. Their slightly larger diameter can be problematic where the batteries are a tight fit.

1st generation 
The Eneloop Pro (or XX powered by Eneloop Technology in the US, Canada, and Europe) series was introduced in 2011. At that time, no AAA version was produced. They have a higher capacity than regular Eneloop cells, 2,500 mAh (min. 2,400 mAh) for AA. They retain 75% of their initial charge after one year, and can be recharged 500 times, significantly less than the standard non-Pro Eneloop line. The product numbers are HR-3UWX (AA) and HR-3UWXA (AA).

2nd generation 
In January 2013, Sanyo announced the second generation of Eneloop XX (model HR-3UWXB, or Panasonic BK-3HCC), branded Eneloop Pro. The new generation has a 50 mAh higher capacity (2,550 mAh nominal, 2,450 mAh minimum capacity), and the self-discharge rate was improved, retaining 85% up to one year. They also introduced an AAA version of the Eneloop XX (model HR-4UWXB) with a nominal capacity of 950 mAh (900 mAh minimum). After the acquisition by Panasonic, they were renamed Eneloop Pro (model BK-4HCC) in Europe (BK-4HCCE) and the Americas (BK-4HCCA).

3rd generation 
In October 2015, Panasonic remodeled Eneloop Pro (BK-3HCD/BK-4HCD). The minimum capacity of the battery increased, by 50 mAh to 2500 mAh for AA and by 30 mAh to 930 mAh for AAA.

Eneloop Plus 
Eneloop Plus cells have a PTC thermistor built-in that cuts the power in case of overheating. This makes them especially suitable for toys and devices that generate significant heat. Other specifications are identical to the second-generation Eneloop batteries. The product number is HR-3UPT (AA), and the battery was released in Japan in December 2011. It was later discontinued.

Counterfeit Eneloops
There are many counterfeit Eneloop batteries; in particular batteries sold on online auction sites are often fake. Ways to distinguish genuine batteries have been published.

Variant comparison tables

AA size

AAA size

References

External links 

 
 Eneloop encyclopedia

Products introduced in 2005
Battery manufacturers
Consumer battery manufacturers
Nickel–metal hydride batteries
Japanese brands
Panasonic Corporation brands